Los Pagares de Mendieta is a b&w 1939  Argentine comedy film directed by Leopoldo Torres Ríos. The film premiered in Buenos Aires on 18 October 1939 and starred Tito Lusiardo.

Cast
Tito Lusiardo as Pancho
Severo Fernandez as Teodi
Felisa Mary as Micaela
Rosa Rosen as Clota
Mary Paretz as Betti
Armando de Vicent
Antonio Capuano
Arturo Palito

References

External links

1939 films
1930s Spanish-language films
Argentine black-and-white films
1939 comedy films
Films directed by Leopoldo Torres Ríos
Argentine comedy films
1930s Argentine films